Michał Wróbel (born April 27, 1980 in Gliwice) is a retired Polish professional football player. He is currently the goalkeeper coach of Olimpia Grudziądz.

Career

Club
In February 2011, he joined Olimpia Grudziądz on one and a half year contract.

He scored his first goal in drawn match against GKS Katowice in 94 minute.

Coaching career
In January 2018, Wróbel was hired as a goalkeeper coach by his former club Olimpia Grudziądz. He left the position in August 2019.

References

External links
 

1980 births
Living people
Polish footballers
Górnik Zabrze players
Szczakowianka Jaworzno players
Wisła Kraków players
Unia Janikowo players
Olimpia Grudziądz players
KSZO Ostrowiec Świętokrzyski players
Sportspeople from Gliwice
Association football goalkeepers